John Clark House may refer to:

Capt. John Clark House, Canterbury, Connecticut, listed on the National Register of Historic Places (NRHP)
John Clark House (Lexington, Kentucky), listed on the NRHP in Fayette County, Kentucky
John Clark House (Rockville, Minnesota), part of an NRHP listing
John Clark House (Clarksdale, Mississippi), NRHP-listed
John Hector Clark House, Clarkton, NC, listed on the NRHP in Bladen County, North Carolina
Jonathan Clark House, Mequon, Wisconsin, listed on the NRHP in Ozaukee County, Wisconsin